Roberto Salvatore Cani (born 17 October 1967) is an Italian violinist.

Roberto Cani was a prizewinner in the Paganini (Genoa, 1990), Jeunesses Musicales (Belgrade, 1991), and Courcillon (France, 1991) International Competitions.

He also won honours in the Tchaikovsky International Competition (Moscow, 1994).

Biography

Roberto Cani was born in Milan, Italy.  His parents are both of Sicilian descent.  He has an older sister, Silvana, and a younger sister, Sandra.  He currently resides in Los Angeles, California.

Education

Roberto Cani began his studies on the violin at the age of seven.  He attended the Milan Conservatory of Music in Milan, where he was awarded the Minetti Prize in 1986.  He also attended the Gnessin Institute of Music in Moscow, and the University of Southern California Thornton School of Music in Los Angeles.  He has studied with Miroslav Roussin, Zinaida Gilels, Pavel Vernikov, Viktor Tretiakov, Abraham Stern, and Alice Schoenfeld.

Career

Roberto Cani made his debut at Gaveau Hall in Paris under direction of maestro Daniele Gatti on 16 January 1987.  He has concertized in his native Italy, Russia, Poland, Croatia, Germany, Austria, Belgium, Spain, Serbia, France, Taiwan, Japan, and South Africa.  He has performed with La Scala Orchestra under Riccardo Muti, Bolgograd Symphony Orchestra, Moscow Symphony Orchestra, RAI Symphony Orchestra, Haydn Orchestra, Orchestra Cantelli, Missouri Chamber Orchestra, Central Symphony Orchestra of Oregon, and the Italian Consort.  He has played in venues such as Los Angeles's Royce Hall, Moscow's Bolshoi Zal and Tchaikovsky Zal, Belgrade's Lisinski Hall, Bristol's St. Georges - Brandon Hill, Tokyo's Suntory Hall and Milan's La Scala.

In addition, Roberto Cani has collaborated with world-class artists such as Massimo Quarta, Enrico Dindo, Andrew Shulman, Jeffrey Swann, Lynn Harrell and Justus Frantz.

Roberto Cani plays on a 1735 Giuseppe Guarneri del Gesù ex Baron Knoop on generous loan from the ProCanale Foundation in Italy.

Recordings

Roberto Cani has recorded for Agora and Arkadia labels.

Sonatas for Solo Violin:  Bartok, Ysaye, Prokofiev, Bloch,  Agora(1996)

Busoni and Respighi Sonatas with Jeffrey Swann, Arkadia (1993)

References

External links
 Official Website of Roberto Cani
 Roberto Cani at LA Opera

Italian classical violinists
Male classical violinists
1967 births
Living people
People of Sicilian descent
Musicians from Milan
Gnessin State Musical College alumni
Paganini Competition prize-winners
Milan Conservatory alumni
USC Thornton School of Music alumni
21st-century classical violinists
21st-century Italian male musicians